The Curtain Falls is a 1934 drama film directed by Charles Lamont and starring Henrietta Crosman as an elderly actress on the brink of retirement. This film was made and released by the Poverty Row motion picture studio Chesterfield Pictures and was filmed at RKO Studios in Hollywood. Karl Brown wrote the story and screenplay.

Crosman plays an actress called Sarah Crabtree, an obvious amalgamation of the names of Victorian era stage stars Sarah Bernhardt and Lotta Crabtree.

A rare film, it is now released on the Alpha DVD.

Cast
Henrietta Crosman as Sarah Crabtree
Dorothy Lee as Dot Scorsby
Holmes Herbert as John Scorsby
Natalie Moorhead as Katherine Scorsby
John Darrow as Allan Scorsby
William Bakewell as Barry Graham
Jameson Thomas as Martin Deveridge
Dorothy Revier as Helena Deveridge
Eddie Kane as Taggart
Aggie Herring as Mrs. McGillicuddy
Tom Ricketts as Hotel Manager
Bryant Washburn as Doctor

uncredited
Lloyd Ingraham as Banker
Al Bridge as Mover  
Robert Frazer as McArthur
Bess Flowers  
Edward LeSaint  
Lafe McKee

References

External links
The Curtain Falls @ IMDb.com
AllMovie.com; synopsis

1934 films
Films directed by Charles Lamont
Chesterfield Pictures films
1934 drama films
American drama films
American black-and-white films
1930s English-language films
1930s American films